KVIM-LP (92.7 FM) was a non-commercial low power FM radio station airing religious programming in Juneau, Alaska.

KVIM had one live show called "Rush Hour" hosted by Adam Weed and David Easaw.  "Rush Hour" ran every Wednesday from 5:00PM to 6:00PM.

Owners Calvary Fellowship surrendered the station's license to the Federal Communications Commission (FCC) on April 7, 2016; the FCC cancelled the license on April 29, 2016.

External links
 

VIM-LP
VIM-LP
Radio stations established in 2006
2006 establishments in Alaska
Defunct radio stations in the United States
Radio stations disestablished in 2016
2016 disestablishments in Alaska
Defunct religious radio stations in the United States

VIM-LP